Eclogavena dani is a species of sea snail, a cowry, a marine gastropod mollusk in the family Cypraeidae, the cowries.

Description

Distribution

References

 Bouchet, P.; Fontaine, B. (2009). List of new marine species described between 2002–2006. Census of Marine Life.

Cypraeidae
Gastropods described in 2002